Mercurius is a lunar impact crater that is located in the northeastern part of the Moon. It lies to the northeast of the smaller crater Carrington, and west-northwest of Zeno. Just to the south is the small lunar mare named Lacus Spei, and to the west is the larger Lacus Temporis.

The rim of Mercurius is circular, with a somewhat irregular edge. There are small outward bulges along several sections of the rim, with the most notable bulges being along the eastern and southern sides. The inner wall has slumped around much of the perimeter, producing a sharp edge. The sides are also somewhat worn, with some tiny craterlets overlying the inner wall.

Within the rim the interior floor has been resurfaced by lava and is nearly level, with a slight hint of a central mound. The remainder of the floor is marked only by a few tiny craterlets and some low ridges in the northeastern corner.

Satellite craters
By convention these features are identified on lunar maps by placing the letter on the side of the crater midpoint that is closest to Mercurius.

References

 
 
 
 
 
 
 
 
 
 
 
 

Impact craters on the Moon